Abu Dhabi Indian School, commonly abbreviated as "ADIS", is a private school offering Indian curriculum education in Abu Dhabi, United Arab Emirates. The school is managed by a Board of Governors. The school is established for the Indian community in Abu Dhabi, with the oversight of the Ambassador of India to the United Arab Emirates as Chief Patron. The school is affiliated to the Central Board of Secondary Education, New Delhi, India and is recognized and licensed by the Ministry of Education, Abu Dhabi.

History
Abu Dhabi Indian School was initially based at the old Indian Social Center (ISC) premises in the year 1975. It was established to provide educational facilities for the Indian community in the UAE. The school was able to have its own campus by 1980, with the help of the Late UAE President, Sheikh Zayed bin Sultan Al Nahyan, who donated a plot of land in the Shabia Muroor Area to the Indian community.

Al Wathba branch
On 14 September 2014, in the Al Wathba region in the outskirts of Abu Dhabi city, the first external branch of the school opened up with the official name of Abu Dhabi Indian School-Branch 1, Al Wathba (ADIS-1) with an independent administrative system. In 2019 the size of the new school was 3300 students with 240 teachers.

Notable alumni
Benny Dayal, Indian singer 
Vishakha Singh, Indian Actress
Jonathan Figy, UAE cricketer
Sidin Vadukut, Author

References

External links
Abu Dhabi Indian School website

Educational institutions established in 1975
Indian international schools in the United Arab Emirates
International schools in Abu Dhabi
1975 establishments in the United Arab Emirates
2014 establishments in the United Arab Emirates
Educational institutions established in 2014